S/T is the pseudo-eponymous album by the electronic music group Electric President. Released in January 2006, on the Morr Music label, the album is their first full-length record.

Two music videos were created for the tracks "Insomnia" and "Grand Machine No. 12". "Insomnia" was also featured during the closing sequence of an episode of the  Fox Network show, The OC.

A recurring theme on this record is a description of an automated, inhuman society.

Track listing
"Good Morning, Hypocrite" – 5:21
"Insomnia" – 4:13
"Ten Thousand Lines" – 5:32
"Grand Machine No. 12" – 3:59
"Hum" – 2:16
"Snow on Dead Neighborhoods" – 3:24
"Some Crap About the Future" – 5:02
"Metal Fingers" – 3:48
"We Were Never Built to Last" – 4:25
"Farewell" – 7:55

2006 albums
Electric President albums
Morr Music albums